Önügüü–Progress is a political party in Kyrgyzstan led by Bakyt Torobayev.

History
Önügüü–Progress was formed in 2012 by Torobayev after he left Respublika, and primarily draws its support from southern Kyrgyzstan, where there is a significant Uzbek population. In December 2013 the Uluttar Birimdigi party merged into it.

In the 2015 parliamentary elections the party received 9.3% of the vote, winning 13 seats in the Supreme Council. However, in October 2017 three of its MPs were expelled from the party, leaving it with 10 seats.

References

External links
Official website

Political parties in Kyrgyzstan
2012 establishments in Kyrgyzstan
Political parties established in 2012